Kristianstad Handbollsklubb is a Swedish women's handball club from Kristianstad.

Kits

European record

Team

Current squad
Squad for the 2018–19 season

Goalkeepers
 1  Petra Kudláčková
 12  Nora Persson
Wingers
RW
 17  Linnea Efraimsson
 19  Zoe Afram
LW
 9  Cindy Birberg
 13  Caroline Månsson
Line players
 14  Sally Sivertson
 17  Johanna Johansson
 24  Josefine Gunnarsson

Back players
LB
 4  Andrea Jacobsen
 8  Sarah Carlström
 18  Dajana Jovanovska
CB
 14  Elin Steen
 20  Martina Weisenbilderová
 27  Johanna Hilli 
RB
 5  Julia Andrejic Nilsso
 33  Martina Crhová

Former club members

Notable former players

 Lucie Satrapova (2015-2018)
 Petra Kudláčková (2018-2021)
Asli Iskit (2016-2018)

External links
 
 

Swedish handball clubs
Sport in Kristianstad Municipality